Joo Hyun-myeong (born 31 May 1997) is a South Korean racewalker. In 2018, he won the bronze medal in the men's 50 kilometres walk at the 2018 Asian Games held in Jakarta, Indonesia.

Career 

In 2016, he competed in the men's 10,000 metres walk at the 2016 IAAF World U20 Championships held in Bydgoszcz, Poland. He finished in 22nd place. In 2017, he competed in the men's 20 kilometres walk at the 2017 Summer Universiade held in Taipei, Taiwan. He finished in 11th place.

In 2019, he competed in the men's 20 kilometres walk at the 2019 Summer Universiade held in Naples, Italy and he won the silver medal in the team event.

References

External links 
 

1997 births
Living people
South Korean male racewalkers
Athletes (track and field) at the 2018 Asian Games
Asian Games medalists in athletics (track and field)
Asian Games bronze medalists for South Korea
Medalists at the 2018 Asian Games
Universiade silver medalists in athletics (track and field)
Universiade silver medalists for South Korea
Competitors at the 2017 Summer Universiade
Medalists at the 2019 Summer Universiade
21st-century South Korean people